Ribari is a town in the municipality of Šabac, Serbia. According to the 2002 census, the town has a population of 2131 people. The village has a Serb ethnic majority.

References

Populated places in Mačva District